Silers Bald is a mountain in the western Great Smoky Mountains, located in the Southeastern United States.  Its proximity to Clingmans Dome and its location along
the Appalachian Trail make it a popular hiking destination.

Silers Bald is located on the crest of the Smokies with Thunderhead Mountain to the west and Clingmans Dome to the east.  The Tennessee-North Carolina state line crosses 
the summit, with the mountain split evenly between Sevier County, Tennessee to the north and Swain County, North Carolina to the south.  Silers Bald rises appx. 
 above its northern base near Fish Camp Prong (of Little River), and appx.  above its southern base near Forney Creek.

While Silers Bald was a grassy bald for most of the 19th and early-20th centuries, it was probably a wooded peak before the arrival of European settlers.  For this reason, the park service does not 
maintain the bald atop the mountain (the Great Smoky Mountains National Park currently
maintains only two grassy balds— Gregory Bald and Andrews Bald).  A narrow corridor for
the Appalachian Trail, which crosses the summit, is kept clear for thru-hikers.  There is still
Trail makes a 90-degree turn.  Several grassy meadows remain on the mountain's western slope.

Geology 

Silers Bald consists of Thunderhead sandstone, a small pile of which crowns the 
summit.  This sandstone, part of the Ocoee Supergroup, was formed from ocean sediments
nearly a billion years ago.  The mountain, like most of the Smokies, was formed some
200 million years ago when the North American and African plates collided during the 
Appalachian orogeny, pushing the rock upward.

History 

While Silers Bald is hardly mentioned in Cherokee lore, a petroglyph was discovered near
the summit in 1917.  The mountain's elevation is probably recorded by Arnold Guyot 

Silers Bald is named after Jesse Siler, a prominent North Carolinian who grazed sheep
and cattle atop the mountain in the 19th century.  Likewise, Siler Bald, in the  Nantahala
Mountains to the south, was named after Jesse's brother, William.  Albert Mountain,
also to the south, was named after Jesse's nephew, Albert Siler.

By the late 19th century, Silers Bald was the far eastern end of a giant grassy pasture that
stretched several miles across the Smokies' western ridge all the way to Russell Field, which overlooks
Cades Cove.   The mountain is mentioned several times in Horace Kephart's Our Southern Highlanders as the last stop before one enters a heavily-wooded wilderness.  According to Kephart, beyond "Hall cabin" (a herder's shack near modern Big Chestnut Bald, six miles (10 km) east of Thunderhead):

...there is just one shack, at Siler's Meadow.  It is down below the summit, hidden in timber, and you would never have seen it.  Even if you had, you would have found it as bare as a last year's mouse nest, for nobody ever goes there except for a few bear-hunters.  From there onward for forty miles is an uninhabited wilderness so rough that you could not make seven miles a day in it to save your life..."

Laura Thornborough, a writer who visited Silers Bald in the 1930s, recalls it as a giant meadow:

Silers is one of the mysterious grassy balds, or mountain-top meadows, and an outstanding vantage point commanding spectacular views.

Access 

The easiest access to Silers Bald is to take the Clingmans Dome tower trail from the
Forney Ridge Parking Lot to the tower.  From there, following the Appalachian Trail west
for just over four miles (6 km) brings one to the summit of Silers Bald.  This leg of the trail is riddled
with elevation gain and loss, crossing Mt. Buckley (a knob of Clingmans Dome), Jenkins
Knob, and a sparsely-wooded ridge known as "The Narrows".

At the summit of Silers Bald, an unmarked spur trail winds several yards to a cliff on 
the northwest slope of the mountain.  This cliff offers a 180-degree view of the northern
Smokies, with a clear shot of Mount Le Conte to the east and Thunderhead Mountain to the 
west.

See also
List of mountains in North Carolina

References

External links
 Great Smoky Mountains National Park Trail Map - Large file in .pdf format.
 Silers Bald - Peakbagger.com
 Silers Bald Shelter - one of the better backwoods shelters along the Appalachian Trail

Mountains of Great Smoky Mountains National Park
Mountains on the Appalachian Trail
Mountains of Tennessee
Mountains of North Carolina
Protected areas of Sevier County, Tennessee
Protected areas of Swain County, North Carolina
Appalachian balds
Mountains of Swain County, North Carolina
Mountains of Sevier County, Tennessee